"Funkin' for Jamaica (N.Y.)" is a 1980 single by jazz trumpeter Tom Browne. The single—a memoir of the Jamaica neighborhood in the New York City borough of Queens where Browne was born and raised—is from his second solo album, Love Approach. Browne got the idea for the song while he was at his parents' home. The vocals for the single were performed by Toni Smith (Thomassina Carrollyne Smith), who also helped compose the song. The song hit number one on the US Billboard R&B chart for a month. "Funkin' for Jamaica" peaked at number nine on the dance chart and made the Top 10 on the UK Singles Chart, but it never charted on the Billboard Hot 100.

Personnel 
 Tom Browne – trumpet
 Dave Grusin – piano
 Bernard Wright – electric piano, synthesizer
 Bobby Broom – guitar
 Marcus Miller – bass
 Buddy Williams – drums
 Errol "Crusher" Bennett – percussion
 Alvin Flythe – rap, handclaps
 Mike Flythe – rap, handclaps
 Kevin Osborne – rap, handclaps
 Toni Smith – vocals, handclaps

Charts

Weekly charts

Year-end charts

Covers and samples

 The 1981 UK funk/disco novelty "The Wikka Rap" by The Evasions featured heavy sampling of "Funkin' for Jamaica'", from which in turn a vocal sample was included on Coolio's song "1, 2, 3, 4 (Sumpin' New)".
 In 1989, American rapper Tone Loc sampled "Funkin' for Jamaica" for his song "I Got It Goin' On" on his debut album Lōc-ed After Dark.
 In 1996, The song was sampled by Quad City DJ's for their song, "Quad City Funk" on the album Get On Up and Dance.
 DJ Tōwa Tei released his remix cover version as a single in both 1999 and 2001, which featured Les Nubians on vocals, performing part of the song in French.
 In 2000, the song was featured on the Bob Baldwin album BobBaldwin.com  with Tom Browne performing.
 In 2001, the song's intro was sampled on the Mariah Carey single "Don't Stop (Funkin' 4 Jamaica)" for the soundtrack to Carey's film Glitter. The song has also been sampled by The Evasions, N.W.A, EPMD, Snoop Dogg, Keith Murray, Smooth, Erykah Badu, Shaquille O' Neal, and The Black Eyed Peas.
 In 2006, contemporary jazz guitarist Patrick Yandall covered the song on his album Samoa Soul.
 In 2007, the song was interpolated by The Clark Sisters for their song "Livin'" on their live album, Live – One Last Time, written by Donald Lawrence and Loren McGee.

References

External links
 (short version)
 (long version)

1980 singles
1980 songs
Arista Records singles
Disco songs